John Barker may refer to:

Business
 John Barker (advertising executive) (born 1965), founder of Barker/DZP
 John Barker (businessman) (1847–1925), Australian
 John H. Barker, American businessman, owner of the John H. Barker Mansion in Michigan City, Indiana

Politics
 John Barker (died 1589) (c. 1532–1589), MP for Ipswich
 John Barker (died 1618) (1579–1618), MP for Shrewsbury
 John Barker (Bristol MP) (died 1636), English politician
 Sir John Barker, 4th Baronet (1655–1696), English MP for Ipswich
 John Barker (diplomat) (1771–1849), English diplomat and horticulturist
 Sir John Barker, 1st Baronet (1840–1914), founder of Barkers department store in Kensington, London, and Liberal MP
 John Barker (MP for Ilchester), English merchant and politician
 John Barker (Parliamentarian), English draper and politician, MP for Coventry
 John Barker (parliamentary officer) (1815–1891), clerk of the colonial Victorian (Australia) parliament
 John Barker (Australian politician) (born 1947)
 John Barker (Philadelphia) (c. 1746–1818), Mayor of Philadelphia, Pennsylvania from 1807 to 1810 and 1812–1813
 John Barker (Kansas politician) (born 1951), member of the Kansas House of Representatives
 John Barker, author and member of the militant group The Angry Brigade

Religion
 John Barker (minister) (1682–1762), Presbyterian divine
 John Barker (Master of Christ's College, Cambridge) (1728–1808), priest and academic
 John Barker (priest) (1912–1992), Dean of Cloyne

Sports
 John Barker (Australian footballer) (born 1975), for Hawthorn, Brisbane Lions, and Fitzroy
 John Barker (English footballer) (1948–2004)
 John Barker (Scottish footballer) (1869–1941)

Other
 John Barker (scholar) (fl. c. 1471–1482), Old Etonian logician
 John Barker (died 1653), English ship-owner
 John Barker (medical writer) (1708–1748), medical writer
 John William Barker (1872–1924), American general
 John Barker (RAF officer) (1910–2004), commander of the Royal Ceylon Air Force
 John Barker (architect) (1940–2010), Australian architect
 John Barker (filmmaker), South African filmmaker
 John W. Barker (1933–2019), American historian
 John Barker (ballet) (1929–2020), American dancer, ballet teacher and translator
 John Barker (died 1968), psychiatrist who set up the British Premonitions Bureau